Kayo César Dias Sanches Borges (born 22 April 1990), commonly known as Kayo Dias, is a Brazilian footballer who currently plays as a midfielder for V.League 1 side Thể Công .

Career statistics

Club

Notes

References

1990 births
Living people
Brazilian footballers
Brazilian expatriate footballers
Association football midfielders
Associação Desportiva Recreativa e Cultural Icasa players
Maringá Futebol Clube players
Esporte Clube Comercial (MS) players
Volta Redonda FC players
Cuiabá Esporte Clube players
Esporte Clube Democrata players
São Carlos Futebol Clube players
Viettel FC players
Brazilian expatriate sportspeople in Vietnam
Expatriate footballers in Vietnam
People from Campo Grande
Sportspeople from Mato Grosso do Sul